The 27th Infantry Regiment, nicknamed the "Wolfhounds", is a regiment of the United States Army established in 1901, that served in the Philippine–American War, in the Siberian Intervention after World War I, and as part of the 25th Infantry Division ("Tropic Lightning") during World War II, the Korean War, and later the Vietnam War. More recently the regiment deployed to Afghanistan for the second time, following two deployments to Iraq. The regimental march is the Wolfhound March.

First and second formations
Prior to its establishment in 1901, the Wolfhound Regiment was preceded by two US Army 27th Infantry Regiments:
 27th U.S. Infantry Regiment constituted 29 January 1813; consolidated 3 July 1815 with 4 other regiments to become 6th Infantry Regiment (United States).
 27th U.S. Infantry Regiment constituted 3 May 1861 as 2nd Battalion/18th Infantry Regiment (United States); redesignated 27th Infantry Regiment 21 September 1866; consolidated 10 March 1869 with 9th Infantry Regiment to form 9th Infantry Regiment (United States)

Third formation – the "Wolfhounds" 
The 27th Infantry Regiment was established by act of Congress on 2 February 1901. James M. J. Sanno was assigned to command in August, and the regiment saw its first combat action in 1902 while serving as part of the American force sent to quell the Philippine Insurrection on the island of Mindanao.

By 1904–1905, the unit had returned from the Philippines and its battalions were stationed at Fort Sheridan (Chicago, Illinois) and Columbus Barracks (Columbus, Ohio).  The 1st Battalion, 27th Infantry participated in field maneuvers with the mobilized Ohio National Guard in southeastern Ohio (near Athens, Ohio) alongside other regular army units including Troop L of the 4th Cavalry, in a test of the nationally reorganized state militias following the Dick Act of 1903. This unit was involved in the August 19, 1904 riot with Ohio National Guard and civil authorities that resulted in several deaths.

During the Russian Civil War, the 27th Infantry served in the American Expeditionary Force sent to Siberia in 1918. The troops embarked on the Army transports ,  and  departing Manila on 7 August 1918 and arriving Vladivostok on 15 and 16 August. This campaign has become an integral part of the regiment's history. The tenacious pursuit tactics of the regiment won the respect of the Bolsheviks, who gave them the name "Wolfhounds." This emblem continues to serve as the symbol of the 27th Infantry Regiment. During their time in Siberia, the unit was part of the Evgenevka incident, a face-off between the Wolfhounds and the Japanese Military.

In 1920, the regiment was assigned to duty in the Philippines, and Joseph D. Leitch was assigned to command. On 1 March 1921, the 27th Infantry Regiment was assigned to the Hawaiian Division. It served in the Hawaiian Division for over twenty years until it was relieved on 26 August 1941, and assigned to the 25th Infantry Division.

Stationed in Hawaii, they were some of first to fire back at attacking Japanese war planes during Japan's attack on Pearl Harbor. The film and book by James Jones From Here to Eternity was based on some of the Wolfhound regimental life. After seeing extensive action in the Pacific theater during World War II, especially on the island of Guadalcanal during the Battle of Mount Austen, the Galloping Horse, and the Sea Horse, it fought in the last days of the New Georgia Campaign on the right flank on the advance on Munda, Solomon Islands, later during the Battle of Luzon and the ensuing occupation of Japan, the 27th Infantry Regiment earned the nickname "Gentle Wolfhounds" for their support of the Holy Family Home orphanage.

Occupation duties were cut short in July, 1950, when the 27th Infantry Regiment departed for Pusan, South Korea, to assist in holding the Pusan perimeter at the onset of the Korean War. The unit saw heavy action throughout the war, where they were considered the "fire brigade" for the 25th Infantry Division – in essence, making first combat contact with enemy forces. They saw significant fighting at Sandbag Castle. The commander of the 27th Infantry Regiment offered David Hackworth command of a new volunteer raider unit; Hackworth created the 27th Wolfhound Raiders and led them from August to November 1951. The 27th earned ten campaign streamers and three Presidential Unit Citations. Upon conclusion of hostilities in Korea, the unit returned to Schofield Barracks.

The 2nd Battalion, 27th Infantry Regiment, entered the Vietnam War in January, 1966. During their five-year stay in Vietnam, the unit earned two valorous unit citations, and proved to be one of the last 25th Infantry Division units to return home. The regiment participated in Operation Junction City and fought during the Tet Offensive and the May Offensive. The regiment finally returned to Hawaii in April, 1971.

On 10 June 1987, the 2nd Battalion was relieved from their assignment to the 25th Infantry Division, and assigned to the 7th Infantry Division at Fort Ord, California. During their tour at Fort Ord the 2nd and 3rd Battalions were deployed to Honduras in 1988 in support of "Operation Golden Pheasant" and in 1989 they were deployed to Panama in support of "Operation Just Cause." On 15 September 1993, the battalion was inactivated and relieved from assignment to the 7th Infantry Division.

The 2nd Battalion, 27th Infantry Regiment, was again activated on 31 August 1995, and this unit again carries its thirty battle streamers and twelve unit citations on its colors. The motto "Nec Aspera Terrent" translates to "Frightened by no Difficulties," more literally "Not even difficulties frighten [us, them]": nec = nor, not even; aspera (nominative neuter plural noun) = rough things, adversities, difficulties; terrent (3rd person plural present tense verb) = "they (= the difficulties) frighten", from the same root as "terror". It is often stated as "No Fear on Earth," or more colloquially "Difficulties be Damned."

The 4th Battalion, 27th Infantry Regiment, was active in the 3rd Brigade, 25th Infantry Division (L) at Schofield Barracks on the island of Oahu in Hawaii during the late 1980s and early 1990s. Assigned to 2nd Brigade was the 1st Battalion, 27th Infantry Regiment. Elements of 4th Battalion were deployed during Operation Desert Storm and served as guards for Gen. Norman Schwarzkopf during their deployment. They also participated in clearing operations in Kuwait and a security element for later peace talks.

Medal of Honor recipients

Philippine–American War Medal of Honor recipients include:
 Charles G. Bickham, 1st Lieutenant, 27th IN
 George C. Shaw, Brigadier General (Then 1st Lt.), 27th IN

World War II Medal of Honor recipients include:
 Charles W. Davis, Captain, 2nd Battalion's executive officer, 27th IN
 Raymond H. Cooley, Staff Sergeant, Company B, 27th IN

Korean War Medal of Honor recipients include:
 John W. Collier, Corporal, Company C, 27th IN
 Reginald B. Desiderio, Captain, Company E, 27th IN
 Benito Martinez, Corporal, Company A, 27th IN
 Lewis L. Millett, Captain, Company E, 27th IN
 Jerome A. Sudut, Second Lieutenant, Company B, 27th IN

Vietnam War Medal of Honor recipients include:
 John F. Baker, Jr., Sergeant (Then Pfc.), Company A, 2nd Battalion, 27th IN
 Charles C. Fleek, Sergeant, Company C, 1st Battalion, 27th IN
 Robert F. Foley, Captain, Company A, 2nd Battalion, 27th IN
 Paul R. Lambers, Staff Sergeant, Company A, 2nd Battalion, 27th IN
 Riley L. Pitts, Captain, Company C, 2nd Battalion, 27th IN

Regimental distinctive insignia
The 27th Infantry Regiment currently consists of two battalions; the 1/27 and 2/27. While some might believe that there are actually two separate distinctive unit insignia (DUI), one for the 1st Battalion wolfhound unit crest which has the wolfhound facing to the left and 2nd Battalion wolfhound crest has the wolfhound facing to the right on the crest, the wolfhound crests are issued in pairs. While in a Class A uniform a coordinated pair of the two different crests is worn, one on each shoulder with the motto toward the shoulder seam and the head of the wolfhound facing forward.

Charitable activities
Both battalions of the 27th Infantry have entered the 71st year of the regiment's relationship with the children and staff of the Holy Family Home Orphanage, Osaka, Japan. During Christmas 1949, Wolfhounds visited the orphanage to deliver gifts and hold a Christmas party for the children. Recognizing the needs of the children, and the then-limited capacity for self-help in postwar Japan, the regiment turned what was to have been a one-time occurrence into flow of supplies, food, building materials, and medical assistance from American soldiers and their families to the orphans. Soldiers from 1st and 2nd Battalions return to Japan every Christmas, and two children from the orphanage have visited Schofield Barracks annually since 1957. The relationship was recognized by Hollywood in 1956 when members of the regiment were profiled in the 1955 film, Three Stripes in the Sun, starring Aldo Ray.

Battalion commanders
1st Battalion
2022–present LTC Ryan M. Case
2020–2022 LTC Eric B. Alexander
2018–2020 LTC Lou Kangas
2016–2018 LTC Val Bernat
2014–2016 LTC Neal Mayo (Transition back to Light Infantry)
2012–2014 LTC Charles Bergman
2011–2012 LTC Todd Fox
2009–2011 LTC Brown
2006–2009 LTC Rich "Flip" Wilson (Strykers)
2005–2006 LTC Bryan Lee Rudacille (Transition to Strykers)
2002–2005 LTC C. Scott Leith
2000–2002 LTC Billy J. Buckner
1998–2000 LTC William B. Garrett III
1996–1998 LTC Bernard Champoux
1995–1996 LTC Kenneth R Curley
1993–1995 LTC Daniel Fey
1991–1993 LTC Paul Herbert
1989–1991 LTC Roland Carter
1985–1987 LTC David A Crittenden (Transition to Light Infantry)
1982–1985 LTC Howard Thacher Linke
1981–1982 LTC William Petersen
1979–1981 LTC Fred Peters
2nd Battalion
2022–present LTC Pete Leszczynski
2020–2022 LTC Michael C. Haith
2018–2020 LTC Matthew D. Lee
2016–2018 LTC Glen T. Helberg
2014–2016 LTC Kevin J. Williams
2012–2014 LTC Barrett M. Bernard
2010–2012 LTC Daniel Wilson
2008–2010 LTC Raul E. Gonzalez
2005–2008 LTC Drew Meyerowich
2003–2005 LTC Walter E. Piatt
2001–2003 LTC Tom Guthrie
1999–2001 LTC Lee Rudacille
1997–1999 LTC Jon Smart
1996–1997 LTC Greg Lynch
1991–1993 LTC Randy Glass
1988–1991 LTC Alan J. Rock
1986–1988 LTC Joe Trez
1984–1986 LTC Edward Chamberlain
3rd Battalion
1991–1993 LTC William R. Phillips (previously Executive Officer of 3rd Battalion and S3 and XO of 2nd Brigade, 7th Infantry Division (Light)
1989–1991 LTC Scott Hutchison
1989–1990 Col Lynwood Burney (Cold Steel) Note – Col Burney was 2nd Brigade Cdr 7th ID (Light) which consisted of 2/27, 3/27, and 5/21
1987–1989 LTC Joseph Hunt
4th Battalion (inactive)
1995–1996 LTC Greg Lynch (Battalion Reflagged from 4th Battalion to 2nd Battalion in 1996)
1993–1995 LTC William B. Caldwell IV
1991–1993 LTC Danny R. McKnight
1989–1991 LTC Michael A. Thompson

Campaign credits
Philippine Insurrection: Mindanao

World War I: Siberia 1918; Siberia 1919

World War II: Central Pacific; Guadalcanal; Northern Solomons (with arrowhead); Luzon

Korean War: UN Defensive; UN Offensive; CCF Intervention; First UN Counteroffensive; CCF Spring Offensive; UN Summer–Fall Offensive; Second Korean Winter; Korea, Summer–Fall 1952; Third Korean Winter; Korea, Summer 1953

Vietnam: Counteroffensive; Counteroffensive, Phase II; Counteroffensive, Phase III; Tet Counteroffensive; Counteroffensive, Phase IV; Counteroffensive, Phase V; Counteroffensive, Phase VI; Tet 69/Counteroffensive; Summer–Fall 1969; Winter–Spring 1970; Sanctuary Counteroffensive; Counteroffensive, Phase VII

Armed Forces Expeditions: Panama

Decorations
Presidential Unit Citation (Army) for SANGNYONG-NI
Presidential Unit Citation (Army) for TAEGU
Presidential Unit Citation (Army) for HAN RIVER
Presidential Unit Citation (Army) for 19 July 1966
Valorous Unit Award for CU CHI DISTRICT
Valorous Unit Award for SAIGON
Philippine Presidential Unit Citation for 17 OCTOBER 1944 TO 4 JULY 1945
Republic of Korea Presidential Unit Citation for MASAN-CHINJU
Republic of Korea Presidential Unit Citation for MUNSAN-NI
Republic of Korea Presidential Unit Citation for KOREA
Joint Meritorious Unit Award CJTF-7 Baghdad, Iraq 2004-2005
Meritorious Unit Award 2nd BCT, 25th Infantry Division 2004-2005 
Meritorious Unit Award Operation Iraqi Freedom 2006-2007
Meritorious Unit Award Operation Iraqi Freedom 2008-2009
Valorous Unit Award Operation Enduring Freedom 2011–2012

Depictions in media
James Jones wrote From Here to Eternity and The Thin Red Line based on his experiences in Schofield Barracks, Hawaii during the Attack of Pearl Harbor and Guadalcanal during the Battle of Mount Austen, the Galloping Horse, and the Sea Horse as a member of the 27th Infantry Regiment.

The movie Three Stripes in the Sun (1955) is based on the New Yorker magazine article "The Gentle Wolfhound" by Ely Jacques Kahn, Jr.

References

External links

 1st Battalion, 27th Infantry Regiment – US Army website
 Wolfhounds Website / 27th Infantry Regimental Historical Society
 A 1987 U.S. Army news archive about Wolfhounds training at the Jungle Operations Training Center.
 

0027
Allied intervention in the Russian Civil War
Military units and formations established in 1901
Military units and formations of the United States in the Philippine–American War
Infantry regiments of the United States Army in World War II
USInfReg0027
Military units and formations of the United States Army in the Vietnam War